Cytir Mawr  (also written as Cyttir Mawr) is a local nature reserve in Llandegfan, Anglesey, Wales.

History
In July 2006, the site was designated as a local nature reserve. The reserve had previously been owned by Cardiff University but had been donated back to Anglesey.

References

Nature reserves in Anglesey